Skreemer is a six-issue comic book limited series, written by Peter Milligan with art by Brett Ewins and Steve Dillon. The first issue was published by American company DC Comics in May 1989.

Synopsis
The story is set thirty-eight years after the fall of civilization in New York. The central character is Veto Skreemer, an imposing giant in an age when giants are near-obsolete. His story is narrated by Peter Finnegan as he looks back on both Veto's life and how it intersects with the lives of the Finnegan family, contrasting the formers’ rise to power with the latter's struggle to survive.

Inspiration
Brett Ewins, in the foreword to the book, explains that Skreemer has two distinct inspirations. The first is gangster films, specifically Once Upon a Time in America and The Long Good Friday, and the second is James Joyce's Finnegans Wake.

Collected editions
The series has been collected into a trade paperback:
 Skreemer (169 pages, 2002, Titan Books, DC Comics)

Awards
 1989: Won "Favourite Single or Continued Story US" Eagle Award

Notes

References

Comics by Peter Milligan